Republican is an unincorporated community in Bertie County, North Carolina, United States.

The King-Freeman-Speight House, which is listed on the National Register of Historic Places, is located near Republican.

References

Unincorporated communities in Bertie County, North Carolina
Unincorporated communities in North Carolina